Cesare Cantù (December 5, 1804 – March 11, 1895) was an Italian historian.

Biography
Cantù was born December 5, 1804 at Brivio, in Lombardy. He studied in Milan, at the College of St. Alexander Barnabite, and began his career as a teacher. His first literary essay (1828) was a romantic poem entitled Algiso, and in the following year he produced a Storia della città e della diocesi di Como in two volumes (Como, 1829). The death of his father then left him in charge of a large family, and he worked very hard both as a teacher and a writer to provide for them. His prodigious literary activity led to his falling under the suspicions of the Austrian police, who thought he was a member of Young Italy, and he was arrested in 1833.

While in prison writing materials were denied him, but he managed to write on rags with a tooth-pick and candle smoke, and thus composed the novel Margherita Pusterla (Milan, 1838). On his release a year later, as he was prohibited from teaching, literature became his only recourse. In 1836 the Turinese publisher, Giuseppe Pomba, commissioned him to write a universal history, which his vast reading enabled him to do. In six years the work was completed in seventy-two volumes, and immediately achieved a general popularity; the publisher made a fortune out of it, and Cantù's royalties amounted, it is said, to 300,000 lire (£12,000).

Just before the revolution of 1848, being warned that he would be arrested, he fled to Turin, but after the Five Days he returned to Milan and edited a paper called La Guardia Nazionale. Between 1849 and 1850 he published his Storia degli Italiani (Turin, 1855) and many other works. In 1857 the archduke Maximilian tried to conciliate the Milanese by the promise of a constitution, and Cantù was one of the few Liberals who accepted the olive branch, and went about in company with the archduke. This act was regarded as treason and caused Cantù much annoyance in later years. He continued his literary activity after the formation of the Italian kingdom, producing volume after volume until his death. For a short time he was member of the Italian parliament; he founded the Lombard historical society, and was appointed superintendent of the Lombard archives.

Cantù died in Milan on March 11, 1895. He was buried in his hometown of Brivio.

Works

 Algiso (1828).
 Epigramma (1829).
 I Morti di Torino (1831).
 Sul Romanzo Storico (1831).
 Di Victor Hugo e del Romanticismo in Francia (1833).
 Isotta (1833).
 Storia della Dominazione degli Arabi e dei Mori in Ispagna e Portogallo (1833).
 Lord Byron (1833).
 I Crociati a Venezia (1833).
 L'Incontro del Tigre (1834).
 La Madonna d'Imbevera (1835).
 Chateaubriand (1835).
 Rimembranze di un Viaggio in Oriente (1835).
 Le Glorie delle Belle Arti (1835).
 Stefano Gallini (1836).
 Un Viaggio Piovoso (1836).
 I Giovinetti (1836).
 Soria della Caduta dell'impero Romano e della Decadenza della Civiltà (1836).
 Inni (1836).
 Lombardia Pittoresca (1836–38).
 Una Buona Famiglia (1837).
 Il Galantuomo (1837).
 Il Buon Fanciullo (1837).
 Il Giovinetto Drizzato alla Bontà, al Sapee, all'industria (1837).
 Margherita Pusterla (1838).
 Processo Originale degli Untori nella Peste del 1630 (1839).
 Il Letterato (1839).
 Storia Universale (1840–47).
 Di un Nuovo Testo del Giorno di Giuseppe Parini (1841).
 Della Letteratura Italiana (1841).
 Beniamino Franklin (1841).
 La Setajuola (1841).
 Sei Novelle (1841).
 Cronache Milanesi (1842).
 Parini e il suo Secolo (1842).
 Milano e il suo Territorio (1844).
 Novelle Lombarde (1846).
 Fior di Memoria pei Bambini (1846).
 Influenza che Beccaria e Verri Esercitano sulla Condizione Economica Morale del Loro Paese (1846).
 Trattato dei Monumenti di Archeologia e Belle Arti (1846).
 Racconti (1847).
 I Carnevali Milanesi (1847).
 Semplice Informazione (1848).
 Discorso (1848).
 Storia degli Ultimi Tempi (1848).
 La Sollevazione di Milano (1848).
 Storia di Cento Anni, 1750–1850 (1851).
 Ezzelino da Romano (1852).
 Il Bambino (1853).
 La Croce (1854).
 L'Abate Parini e la Lombardia nel Secolo Passato: Studi (1854).
 Storia degli Italiani (1854–56).
 Scorsa di un Lombardo negli Archivi di Venezia (1856).
 Storia di Milano (1857–61).
 Grande Illustrazione del Lombardo-Veneto (1857–61).
 Ai Suoi Elettori (1860).
 Notizie sopra Milano (1860).
 Vincenzo Monti (1861).
 La Contessa Ortensia Carletti nata Liberatore (1862).
 Tommaso Grossi (1862).
 Beccaria e il Diritto Penale (1862).
 Storia della Letteratura Greca (1863).
 Del Diritto nella Storia (1863).
 Il Tempo dei Frencesi, 1796–1815 (1864).
 Opere Minori (1864).
 Storia della Letteratura Latina (1864).
 La Religione e la Critica (1864).
 Sul Giuramento Politico e la Siberia della Scienza (1865).
 Le Elezioni in Italia (1865).
 Sull'origine della Lingua Italiana (1865).
 Storia della Letteratura Italiana (1865).
 Il Principe Eugenio (1865).
 Gli Eretici d'Italia (1865–66).
 Due Politiche (1866).
 Vite Parallele di Mirabeau e Washington (1867).
 Alcuni Italiani Contemporanei Delineati (1868).
 Paesaggi e Macchiette (1868).
 I Doveri di Scuola (1868).
 Il Caffè (1868).
 Il Thè (1868).
 Carta e Libri (1868).
 Del Progresso Positivo (1869).
 Poesie (1870).
 L'Arte e il Pudore (1870).
 Buon Senso e Buon Cuore (1870).
 Antologia Militare (1870).
 Portafoglio d'un Operaio (1871).
 La Quistione Sociale (1871).
 Sulla Questione Operaia (1871).
 Il Patriota Popolano (1872).
 Della Indipendenza Italiana (1872–77).
 Cantate Sacre sulla Passione di Cristo (1873).
 Gli Archivi e la Storia (1873).
 Esempi di Bontà (1873).
 Italiani Illustri (1873–74).
 Narrazioni Scelte di Tito Livio (1875).
 I Lombardi, il Barbarossa e la Battaglia di Legnano (1876).
 Attenzione! (1876).
 Il Convento di Pontida (1876).
 Il Papa e gli Errori del Secolo (1876).
 Gli Ultimi trent'anni (1879).
 Manuale di Storia Italiana (1879).
 Dialogo dei Morti ed Altri Opuscoli di Luciano (1882).
 Nuove Esigenze di una Storia Universale (1882).
 Onoranze ai Vivi (1883).
 Novelle Brianzuole (1883).
 Il Fedone di Platone (1883).
 Niccolò Machiavelli (1885).
 Lavoro e Socialisno (1885).
 Antichi e Moderni (1888).
 Della Letteratura delle Nazioni (1889–91).
 Biografia del Padre Girard (1891).
 Lettere di Uomini Illustri per Demetrio Gramantieri (1894).

Notes

References
 Francesca Kaucisvili Melzi D'Eril: Cesare Cantù e i cattolici liberali francesi, cinque corrispondenze con François-Alexis Rio, Albert DuBoys, Camille de Meaux, Mons. Félix Dupanloup, Maxime de LaRocheterie. (a cura di Francesca Kaucisvili Melzi D'Eril). Milano: Ed. Comune di Milano "Amici del Museo del Risorgimento", 1994.

Further reading
 Finch, James Austin (1886). "Cesare Cantú," The Catholic World, Vol. XLIII, No. 256, pp. 525–534.
 O'Reilly, Bernard (1882). "Cesare Cantù and the Neo-Guelphs of Italy," The American Catholic Quarterly Review, Vol. VII, pp. 632–651.
 O'Reilly, Bernard (1884). "An Italian Champion of Catholic Rights," The American Catholic Quarterly Review, Vol. IX, pp. 693–712.
 Parsons, Reuben (1900). "Cesare Cantù: Prince of Modern Historians." In: Studies in Church History, Vol. VI. New York: Fr. Pustet & Co., pp. 441–447.

External links

 
 
 Works by Césare Cantù, at Hathi Trust
 

1804 births
1895 deaths
People from the Province of Lecco
19th-century male writers
Writers from Lombardy
19th-century Italian historians